The Celtic Media Festival, formerly known as the Celtic Film and Television Festival, aims to promote the languages and cultures of the Celtic nations in film, on television, radio and new media. The festival is an annual three-day celebration of broadcasting and film from Scotland, Ireland, Wales, Isle of Man, Galicia, Cornwall and Brittany. The festival was founded in 1980.

History
The festival was first held in 1980, on the Scottish islands of South Uist and Benbecula. The 30th festival was held in March 2009 in Caernarfon, Wales. The 40th festival was held in Aviemore, Scotland.
The festival presents the Torc Awards to the winners of 26 different categories.

The festival also presents a Gold Torc to the winner of Spirit of the Festival Award - a film or television programme wholly or substantially in a Celtic language that encapsulates the spirit of the Celtic Media Festival.

Chairs
The Celtic Media Festival has been chaired by representatives from the broadcasting industry:

Irish Chairs:
 Alan Esslemont , TG4
 Pádhraic Ó Ciardha, TG4
 Neasa Ní Chinnéide, RTÉ
 Bob Collins, RTÉ
 Con Bushe, RTÉ
 Muiris MacConghail, RTÉ
 Cathal Goan, RTÉ

Scottish Chairs:
 Donald Waters, Grampian Television 
 Neil Fraser, BBC Scotland 
 Maggie Cunningham, BBC Scotland
 Domhnall Caimbeul, MG ALBA

Welsh Chairs:
 Huw Jones, S4C 
 John Hefin, Wales Film Council 
 Owen Edwards, S4C

Festival Locations

Categories
 Documentary / Factual : Factual Series - Factual Entertainment - Single Documentary - History - Sport - Arts - Current Affairs - Feature Documentary
 Drama : Short Drama - Single Drama - Drama Series
 Further Screen Categories : Comedy - Animation - Children - Entertainment - Short Form - Live Music Programme
 Radio : Radio Station of the Year - Radio Documentary - Radio Music Programme - Radio Sports - Radio Presenter/Personality - Radio Comedy - Radio Magazine Show - Radio Drama

See also

 List of Celtic-language media
 List of television festivals

References

Further reading
 Caughie, John (1983), From 'Scotch Reels' to the 'Highland Fling': The Fourth International Festival of Film and Television in the Celtic Countries, in Hearn, Sheila G. (ed.), Cencrastus No. 13, Summer 983, pp. 40 – 42, 
 Russell, Michael W. (1980), First International Festival of Celtic Film, in Cencrastus No. 3, Summer 1980, pp. 8 – 10,

External links
Celtic Media Festival web site

Television festivals
Celtic Revival
Film festivals in Scotland
Celtic film festivals
Breton-language mass media
Scottish Gaelic mass media
Irish-language mass media
Welsh-language mass media
Cornish festivals